Zithulele Patrick Mvemve (31 May 1941 – 6 July 2020) was a South African Roman Catholic bishop.

Mvemve was born in Evaton, South Africa, and educated at St Martin de Porres High School in Soweto.

He was ordained to the priesthood in 1969; he served as titular bishop of Luperciani and auxiliary bishop of the Roman Catholic Archdiocese of Johannesburg from 1988 to 1994, and as bishop of the Roman Catholic Diocese of Klerksdorp, South Africa, from 1994 to 2013.

Notes

1941 births
2020 deaths
People from Emfuleni Local Municipality
21st-century Roman Catholic bishops in South Africa
20th-century Roman Catholic bishops in South Africa
Roman Catholic bishops of Klerksdorp
Roman Catholic bishops of Johannesburg